Prairie is an unincorporated community in Monroe County, Mississippi, United States.

Prairie is located west of Aberdeen on Mississippi Highway 382. A variant name is "Prairie Station".

Gulf Ordnance Plant

From 1942 to 1945, Prairie was the site of the Gulf Ordnance Plant, one of the largest ammunition manufacturing plants of World War II.  Up to 10,000 workers—mostly women—were employed at the plant, which manufactured 20, 40, 57, and 67 millimeter shells, rocket launchers, 100-pound bombs and naval tracer ammunition.

It has been estimated that the Gulf Ordnance Plant supplied nearly a quarter of the munitions used by the U.S. Armed Forces during World War II.

The plant was abandoned following the war.  Mississippi State University runs an experimental cattle ranch on part of the old plant, while the rest lies in ruins.

References

Unincorporated communities in Monroe County, Mississippi
Unincorporated communities in Mississippi